Ghran Saudi City, in the province of Khulays Makkah. Known as the old (Green Valley) located in the northeast of the City of Jeddah about 45 km. Inhabited by approximately 14,900 people.

History
A town inhabited by the Sahaf family (Al Sahafy), who descends from Zabid from the Harb tribe. Ghran lived in the past Bani Lahyan.

One of the most famous historical landmarks of Al-Kadeed water is near the Princess Mosque, on the ancient migration road and its landmarks are named Al-Jufa in the south of the city.

See also 

 List of cities and towns in Saudi Arabia
 Regions of Saudi Arabia

References
List of cities and towns in Saudi Arabia
Makkah Region

Populated places in Mecca Province

SOURCE
صحيفة غراس

Ghran In the arabic language